The San Francisco 49ers have retired 12 jersey numbers.

Retired numbers

* During his tenure with the 49ers from 2006 to 2007, quarterback Trent Dilfer, a long-time friend of Brodie, wore No. 12 with his permission, unofficially unretiring the number as a tribute.

References

Lists of National Football League retired numbers
San Francisco 49ers players
retired numbers